Erotic Elk is a Swedish band making electronic music. The band was founded in the beginning of 2009. Their debut album, Design With Circuitry, released by Major Records was well received:

"Erotic Elk deals with pure synthpop music and the least I can say is that this album sounds like a real revelation to me! The main characteristic and strength of this album is its production. The sound is incredibly powerful and I think it's an essential element for qualitative pop music."

Members 
Tomas Gustafsson
P-O Gustafsson
Fredrik Sigeback

Discography 
Design With Circuitry (2010)
Solitary (2011) - (mixed and mastered by VoA VoXyD from Ad Inferna)

External links

Reviews 
Erotic Elk's debut album has been reviewed by several magazines; among them, Side-Line Magazine, which called it "a real revelation!"
Medienkonverter
Sinsentido Radio
Synth.nu

References

Swedish musical groups